Manish Kaushik may refer to:

 Manish Kaushik (voice actor) (born 1980), Indian voice-dubbing artist
 Manish Kaushik (boxer) (born 1996), Indian boxer